Sainteny is a former commune in the Manche department in Normandy in northwestern France. On 1 January 2016, it was merged into the new commune of Terre-et-Marais.

See also
Communes of the Manche department

References

Former communes of Manche